The Asia/Oceania Zone was one of three zones of regional competition in the 2001 Fed Cup.

Group I
Venue: Kaohsiung, Taiwan (outdoor hard)
Date: 9–14 April

The ten teams were divided into two pools of five teams. The teams that finished first in the pools played-off to determine which team would partake in the World Group Play-offs. The two nations coming last in the pools were relegated to Group II for 2002.

Pools

Play-off

  advanced to 2001 World Group Play-offs.
  Pacific Oceania and  relegated to Group II in 2002.

Group II
Venue: Kaohsiung, Taiwan (outdoor hard)
Date: 9–14 April

The seven teams were divided into two pools of three and four. The top two teams from each pool then moved on to the play-off stage of the competition. The two teams that won a match from the play-off stage would advance to Group I for 2000.

Play-offs

  and  advanced to Group I in 2002.

See also
Fed Cup structure

References

 Fed Cup Profile, Indonesia
 Fed Cup Profile, India
 Fed Cup Profile, Thailand
 Fed Cup Profile, Kazakhstan
 Fed Cup Profile, China
 Fed Cup Profile, South Korea
 Fed Cup Profile, Chinese Taipei
 Fed Cup Profile, New Zealand
 Fed Cup Profile, Uzbekistan
 Fed Cup Profile, Fiji
 Fed Cup Profile, Hong Kong
 Fed Cup Profile, Malaysia
 Fed Cup Profile, Philippines
 Fed Cup Profile, Sri Lanka

External links
 Fed Cup website

 
Asia Oceania
Sport in Kaohsiung
Tennis tournaments in Taiwan
Fed